Jessie Ellen Wadworth (née Brown, 1863 – 8 July 1936) was a British archer who competed at the 1908 Summer Olympics in London. She was born in Devizes and was the mother of Brenda Wadworth. Wadworth competed at the 1908 Games in the only archery event open to women, the double National round competition. She took fourth place in the event with 605 points.

References

External links
 profile
 
 

1863 births
1936 deaths
British female archers
Olympic archers of Great Britain
Archers at the 1908 Summer Olympics
People from Devizes
20th-century British women